Hydrocortisone cypionate, sold under the brand name Cortef, is a synthetic glucocorticoid corticosteroid and a corticosteroid ester.

References

Corticosteroid esters
Cypionate esters
Glucocorticoids